Stefanie McKeough (born January 27, 1991) is a Canadian retired ice hockey player, currently serving as assistant coach to the Ottawa Gee-Gees women's ice hockey program in the Réseau du sport étudiant du Québec (RSEQ) of U Sports. She previously served as head coach of Göteborg HC in the Swedish Women's Hockey League (SDHL). During her playing career, she competed for the Canadian national team at several international tournaments and played with the Wisconsin Badgers in the NCAA.

Playing career
McKeough won the 2008 PWHL Championship with the Ottawa Capitals (now called Senators) of the Provincial Women's Hockey League (PWHL). In addition, she was named Most Valuable Player of her high school team at St. Mark Catholic High School for three consecutive seasons. She helped her high school win two city of Ottawa championships.

Hockey Canada

McKeough was part of the 2008–09 National Women's Under-18 Team that claimed the silver medal at the 2009 IIHF World Women's U-18 Championship. Two of her teammates on that team also played with her on the Wisconsin Badgers: Saige Pacholok and Breann Frykas.

During the summer of 2011, she was one of eight former Ottawa Senators PWHL players (along with Amanda Leveille, Morgan Richardson, Cydney Roesler: U-18 camp; Jamie Lee Rattray, Isabel Menard and Erica Howe: U22 camp) that participated in the Hockey Canada Under 18 and Under 22 training camps at the Canadian International Hockey Academy in Rockland, Ontario. On October 3, 2011, she was named to the Team Canada roster that participated in the 2011 4 Nations Cup.

NCAA
McKeough joined the Wisconsin Badgers in the 2009–10 season. On February 12, 2010, she scored her first NCAA goal in a game versus Minnesota State. Against the Robert Morris Colonials, McKeough had two assists (played on November 7). She repeated the feat on January 23 versus St. Cloud State. Her plus minus rating of +25 led the Badgers.

During the 2010–11 season, McKeough had five games with two points scored. Versus the Ohio State Buckeyes (on October 22), she scored two goals as Wisconsin beat Ohio State by a 6-5 tally in overtime. McKeough would miss four games during the season as she helped Canada win gold at the 2011 MLP Cup. In the championship game of the 2011 Frozen Four, McKeough would notch an assist as the Badgers claimed the Frozen Four title.

Career stats

NCAA

WCHA

Hockey Canada

Awards and honours
 2009-10 All-WCHA Rookie Team
2009-10 All-WCHA Third Team (2009–10)
2010-11 All-WCHA Academic Team
Wisconsin Badgers Defensive Player of the Year (2011–12, 2010–11, 2009–10)

References

1991 births
Living people
Canadian women's ice hockey defencemen
Ice hockey people from Ottawa
Wisconsin Badgers women's ice hockey players
Swedish Women's Hockey League coaches
Canadian ice hockey coaches